Daniel Joseph Wood, 1849 - 1919 FRCO 1873; was an English organist.

Daniel Wood was a chorister and pupil of J. L. Hopkins at Rochester. He came to Chichester after six years as Organist of Boston Parish Church, Lincs., and followed the then current fashion of a short stay as Organist of Chichester Cathedral, before moving to Exeter Cathedral where he was Organist from 1876 to 1919.

References

Sources
Brown, James Duff and Stephen Samuel Stratton. British Musical Biography  page 455. S.S. Stratton. 1897. (ex Harvard University) Digitized October 25, 2007. Online. January 20, 2009. 
 

Cathedral organists
British classical organists
British male organists
1849 births
1919 deaths
Organists & Masters of the Choristers of Chichester Cathedral
Alumni of New College, Oxford
Fellows of the Royal College of Organists
19th-century classical musicians
19th-century British male musicians
Male classical organists